Giacomo Puccini's Messa or Messa a quattro voci (currently more widely known under the apocryphal name of Messa di Gloria) is a Mass composed for orchestra and four-part choir with tenor and baritone soloists. Strictly speaking, the piece is a full Mass, not a true Messa di Gloria (which contains only the Kyrie and Gloria and omits the Credo, Sanctus, Benedictus and Agnus Dei).

History 
Puccini composed the Mass as his graduation exercise from the Istituto Musicale Pacini. It had its first performance in Lucca on July 12, 1880. However, the Credo had already been written and performed in 1878 and was initially conceived by Puccini as a self-contained work. Puccini never published the full manuscript of the Messa, and although well received at the time, it was not performed again until 1952 (first in Chicago and then in Naples). However, he re-used some of its themes in other works, such as the Agnus Dei in his opera Manon Lescaut and the Kyrie in Edgar.

At the end of World War II, Fr. Dante Del Fiorentino purchased an old copy of the manuscript of the Messa from the Vandini family in Lucca, imagining it was the original score.  However, the autograph, in the possession of the Puccini family, was given by his daughter-in-law to Ricordi, Puccini's publishing firm. The ensuing legal battle was finally resolved by dividing the rights to the work between Ricordi and Mills Music (the publishers of Fiorentino's manuscript).

Structure

Recordings
 Alfonso Scarano (cond.), Aleš Briscein (tenor), Roman Janál (baritone), Czech Philharmonic Choir Brno, North Czech Philharmonic Orchestra Teplice, 2014
 Martin Elmquist (cond.), Marcello Bedoni (tenor), Jeff Speres (baritone), Luxembourg Philarmonia, Classico, 2010
  (cond.), Bernhard Schneider (tenor), Christian Schmidt-Timmermann (baritone), Prague Philharmonic Orchestra, 2006
 Ingo Schulz (cond.), Daniel Magdal (tenor), Stefan Stoll (baritone), Ölberg chor, 2004
 Pier Giorgio Morandi (cond.), Antonello Palombi (tenor), Gunnar Lundberg (baritone), Hungarian Opera Orchestra and Radio Choir, Naxos, 2002
 Jürgen Budday (cond.), Willi Stein (tenor), Thomas Pfeiffer (baritone), Kantorei Maulbronn (Choir), South West German Radio Baden-Baden and Freiburg Symphony Orchestra, K&K Verlagsanstalt, 2001
 Antonio Pappano (cond.), Roberto Alagna (tenor), Thomas Hampson (baritone), London Symphony Orchestra and Chorus, Emi Classics, 2001
 Wilfried Maier (cond.), Rolph Romei (tenor), Guillermo Anzorena (baritone), Schwäbischer Sängerbund, Württembergische Philharmonie Reutlingen, 1999
  (cond.), Kölner Philarmoniker, Motette Records, 1995
 András Ligeti (cond.), Dénes Gulyas (tenor), Balazs Poka (baritone), Chœurs de la Radio-Télévision Hongroise, Orchestre Symphonique de Budapest, Hungaroton Classic, 1992
 Claudio Scimone (cond.), José Carreras (tenor), Hermann Prey (baritone), The Ambrosian Singers Philharmonia Orchestra, Erato, 1984
 Eliahu Inbal (cond.), Kari Løvaas (soprano), Werner Hollweg (tenor), Barry McDaniel, Chor des Westdeutschen Rundfunks, Radio-Sinfonie-Orchester Frankfurt, Philips Classics, 1975
 Michel Corboz (cond.), William Johns (tenor), Philippe Huttenlocher (baritone), Chœur symphonique et orchestre de la foundation Gulbenkian de Lisbonne, Erato, 1974

Score

G. Puccini: Messa di Gloria - published choral score
G. Puccini: Messa di Gloria – version for chamber orchestra

References

Further sources
Paul Filmer, Programme Notes: Giacomo Puccini (1858–1924), Messa di Gloria (1880) (sic), North London Chorus, April 2005.
Gabriella Biagi Ravenni, Breve nota sul nome della Messa, Centro studi Giacomo Puccini, 1999.

Puccini
Compositions by Giacomo Puccini
1880 compositions
Puccini